Walter Loosli (1901–?) was a Swiss coxswain. He competed at the 1924 Summer Olympics in Paris with the men's coxed four. In the official Olympic record and the FISA database, he coxed all three races. According to the Sports Reference database, Loosli coxed the first heat and the repechage only and was replaced in the final by Émile Lachapelle. The Swiss team won the final.

References

1901 births
Year of death missing
Swiss male rowers
Olympic rowers of Switzerland
Rowers at the 1924 Summer Olympics
Coxswains (rowing)
Olympic gold medalists for Switzerland
20th-century Swiss people